David M. Boje is Professor and Bill Daniels Ethics Fellow, a past endowed Bank of America professor of management at New Mexico State University (NMSU) in Las Cruces. He has published over 120 journal articles, seventeen books, including Narrative Methods for Organization and Communication Research (Sage, 2001); Storytelling Organizations, 2008; Critical Theory Ethics in Business and Public Administration, 2008. His newest books are: Dancing to the Music of Story (with Ken Baskin), and The Future of Storytelling and Organization: An Antenarrative Handbook (Routledge, 2011).

He is known for his 1991 Administrative Science Quarterly and 1995 Academy of Management Journal articles on 'storytelling organization' in relation to currency of sensemaking in organisations as Tamara (play)-Land. He is also founder of the Tamara Journal for Critical Organization Inquiry.

He invented the term antenarrative which is defined as the double move of a bet (ante) or a before (ante) of story on its way to narrative (Boje, 2011a) and is a part of the triadic theory of storytelling developed by Boje. His handbook on the subject claims to be the first volume to offer a systematic examination of non-traditional narrative inquiry in the management realm, organizing and developing its approach

He is known to teach barefoot as a protest against sweatshops of multinational corporations in developing countries.

See also
 Organizational storytelling
 Storytelling
 Fabula
 Tamara (play)

Bibliography
Boje, D.M. (2001a). Narrative Methods for Organizational and Communication Research, London: Sage.
Boje, D. M. (2001b). Flight of Antenarrative in Phenomenal Complexity Theory, Tamara, Storytelling Organization Theory. 20 September, paper to honor Professor Hugo Letiche and his work on Phenomenal Complexity Theory, for the 24 and 25 September Conference on Complexity and Consciousness at Huize Molenaar (Korte Nieuwstraat 6) in the old center of Utrecht, Netherlands. http://business.nmsu.edu/~dboje/papers/ante/flight_of_antenarrative.htm
Boje, D. M. (2001c). "Antenarrating, Tamara, and Nike Storytelling". Paper prepared for presentation at "Storytelling Conference" at the School of Management; Imperial College, 53 Prince’s Gate, Exhibition Road, London, 9 July 2001. On line at http://business.nmsu.edu/~dboje/papers/ethnostorytelling.htm
Boje, D. M. (2002). "Critical Dramaturgical Analysis of Enron Antenarratives and Metatheatre". Plenary presentation to 5th International Conference on Organizational Discourse: From Micro-Utterances to Macro-Inferences, Wednesday 24th - Friday 26 July (London).
Boje. D. M. 2005. Empire Reading of Manet's Execution of Maximilian: Critical Visual Aesthetics and Antenarrative Spectrality. Tamara Journal. Vol 4 (4): 118–134. http://peaceaware.com/388/articles/20052.pdf
Boje, D. M. (2007a). Chapter 13 Living Story: From Wilda to Disney, pp. 330–354. Handbook of Narrative Inquiry: Mapping a New Methodology. Edited by Jean Clandinin, London: Sage.
Boje, D. M. (2007b). "The Antenarrative Cultural Turn in Narrative Studies" in Mark Zachry & Charlotte Thralls (Eds.) Communicative Practices in Workplaces and the Professions: Cultural Perspectives on the Regulation of Discourse and Organizations.
Boje, D. M. 2007c. Globalization Antenarratives. pp. 505–549, Chapter 17 in Albert Mills, Jeannie C. Helms-Mills & Carolyn Forshaw (Eds). Organizational Behavior in a Global Context. Toronto: Garamond Press.
Boje, D. M. (2008a). Storytelling Organizations, London: Sage.
Boje, D. M. (2010). Towards a postcolonial storytelling theory that interrogates tribal peoples' Material-Agential-Storytelling ignored in management and organization studies. Under review, and working paper available from dboje at nmsu.edu
Boje, D.M. (2011). Storytelling and the future of organizations, Routledge Taylor & Francis group.
Boje (forthcoming). Antenarrative in management research. The Sage Dictionary of Qualitative Management Research: London (2,500 words). Accepted 2006. Draft available at http://business.nmsu.edu/~dboje/690/papers/Antenarrative%20in%20Management%0research%20May%2014%2005.pdf
Boje, D. M. & Baskin, K. (2010). Dancing to the Music of Story. Charlotte, NC: Information Age Press. See Chapter 1 on complexity.
Boje, D. M. (2011). Shaping the Future of Storytelling in Organizations: An Antenarrative Handbook. London: Routledge (release date is March 2011).
Boje, D. M. & Grace Ann Rosile (2002). Enron Whodunit? Ephemera. Vol 2(4), pp. 315–327.
Boje, D. M. & Grace Ann Rosile (2003). Life Imitates Art: Enron’s Epic and Tragic Narration. Management Communication Quarterly. Vol. 17 (1): 85–125.
Boje, D. M., Rosile, G.A., Durant, R.A. & Luhman, J.T. 2004 "Enron Spectacles: A Critical Dramaturgical Analysis". Special Issue on Theatre and Organizations edited by Georg Schreyögg and Heather Höpfl, Organization Studies, 25(5):751-774.
Boje, D. M.; Rosile, G. A.; & Gardner, C. L. 2007. "Antenarratives, Narratives and Anaemic Stories" Chapter 4, pp. 30–45, Storytelling in Management, Editors: Ms. Nasreen Taher and Ms. Swapna Gopalan, Publisher: The Icfai University Press, India, First Edition: 2007 (Note: was based upon Paper presented in Showcase Symposium, Academy of Management,. Mon 9 Aug 2004 in New Orleans).

References

Further reading
Smith, William L.; Boje, David M.; & Melendrez, Kevin D, (2010) "The financial crisis and mark-to-market accounting: An analysis of cascading media rhetoric and storytelling", Qualitative Research in Accounting & Management, Vol. 7 Iss: 3, pp. 281–303.
Yolles, Maurice (2007), "The dynamics of narrative and antenarrative and their relation to story", Journal of Organizational Change Management, 20(1)74–94

New Mexico State University faculty
Living people
Year of birth missing (living people)